Baoris is a genus of grass skippers in the family Hesperiidae.It is found in the Indomalayan realm

Species
Baoris farri (Moore, 1878)  
Baoris leechii  Elwes & Edwards, 1897 West and Central China
Baoris longistigmata  Huang, 1999  
Baoris oceia  (Hewitson, 1868)  
Baoris pagana  (de Nicéville, 1887) 
Baoris penicillata  Moore, [1881] India, Ceylon, India, Thailand, Laos.
Baoris chapmani Evans, 1937 Burma, Bangladesh
Baoris unicolor Moore, [1884]

Biology 
The larvae feed on Gramineae including Dinochloa, Bambusa, Dendrocalamus, Ochlandra, Saccharum , Oryza

References

Natural History Museum Lepidoptera genus database
Baoris  Moore, 1881 at Markku Savela's Lepidoptera and Some Other Life Forms

Hesperiinae
Hesperiidae genera